Yu Yamamoto (山本優, Yamamoto Yū, born 20 August 1988) is a Japanese softball player. She competed in the 2020 Summer Olympics and won a gold medal.

References

1988 births
Living people
Softball players at the 2020 Summer Olympics
Japanese softball players
Olympic softball players of Japan
Asian Games medalists in softball
Softball players at the 2018 Asian Games
Medalists at the 2018 Asian Games
Softball players at the 2014 Asian Games
Medalists at the 2014 Asian Games
Asian Games gold medalists for Japan
Olympic medalists in softball
Olympic gold medalists for Japan
Medalists at the 2020 Summer Olympics
21st-century Japanese women